= Fengbao Iron and Steel =

Chinese manufacturing company

Henan Fengbao Iron and Steel Company Limited (Chinese: 河南凤宝钢铁有限公司) was established in 2001 when the formerly state-owned Chinese enterprise was restructured according to the modern enterprise system to form a limited liability company. The company's activities include melting iron and steel smelting, seamless steel pipe, machinery manufacturing, power generation, international trade, and others.

It is a large-scale iron and steel company, and is a member unit of China's Iron and Steel Industry Association. It is one of the nation's 1,000 largest industrial enterprises, the country's top 500 private enterprises in Henan Province, and 100 key enterprises in Henan Province.

== Projects ==
The company is actively pursuing the project of steel construction and two high-end oil well pipe project preparatory work. When the project is fully completed, it will have an annual output of 5 million tons steel, including oil pipe, structure pipe, high and medium pressure boiler tubes, pipes and other high-end seamless steel tubes will reach 2 million tons.
